Maneco Galeano (Puerto Pinasco, May 13, 1945 - Paraguay), was a Paraguayan musician, songwriter and journalist.

Childhood and youth
Son of W. Antonio Galeano and Ana Mieres, his real name was Felix, after his grandfather on his father side, and Roberto, after his grandfather, on his mother side.
He was two years when the cruel civil war of `47 started. He always remember his father, was on his way to prison for defending his principles and ideals, on the harbor of Puerto Pinasco, waving his handkerchief, blond and happy. In this time he was given his first guitar, a toy one, and he enjoyed singing songs he imagined himself with it.

At the beginning of 1948, his family decides to move to Asuncion. He begins his studies at the Colegio San Jose, an educational institution to which he was to be linked during all his life. He was a lively and nonconformist teenager, and also studied at the Liceo Militar Acosta Ñu as well as in the Colegio Carlos Antonio Lopez. He finished his high school in the Colegio Lasalle, in Buenos Aires, with honors.

In 1962, with his father in the diplomatic service, the family moves to the Argentine capital. There he joined with other Paraguayans fellow musicians and forms a band where he sings and plays the guitar.

When he returns to his country, he begins the university but he doesn't finish his studies. He begins to compose. In the middle of the 1960s he shows some of his first works, very elemental but with purity.

First steps

His friend and teacher at journalism, Fernando Cazenave, invites him to be a part of the crew at the Diario ABC Color newspaper when it is opened, in 1967. He then begins the career as a social communicator, a condition he would carry with pride until his death, as a collaborator of La Tribuna and El Diario Hoy, where he was the chief of the sports section as well as the secretary of editorial staff.

Another great passion of his, besides his obvious love for music, was the love for teaching. Since 1974 until 1978 he taught music at his old school, San Jose.

On April 19, 1969, he married Maria Cristina Barrail Pecci. He had four daughters: Sandra Maria, Viviana Guadalupe, Ana Karina and Maria Alegria.

Works

At the end of the `60 he composes songs to accompany carnival groups (comparsas) at the Centenario Club. These “comparsas” were also directed by him. From these years, specifically from 1969 to 1970 are his first satirical songs. “Los problemas que acarrea un televisor en la casa de un hombre como yo”, “La chuchi” y “Tomás te canasta” find an immediate eco in the public. With them he begins to shape his own profile, the unique Maneco Galeano of the Paraguayan popular compositions.

At the end of 1970, when all the young composers and players find their meeting point at “La Guarida del Matrero”, managed by Santi Medina, he participated on a television show with Christmas themes, where he presented “Dos trocitos de Madera”, historically his first “serious“ piece.

In 1971 “Soy de la Chacarita” is written. His first appearance is at a beneficial festival on behalf of the people who suffered the great flood of the Rio Paraguay, who left many families by the river homeless.

He founded the “ Joven Alianza” with other friends such as Carlos Noguera, Mito Sequera, Juan Manuel Marcos and Jose Antonio Galeano. This was an intent of creative and artist cooperative which was later to be destroyed by the political police of the dictatorship of then President Alfredo Stroessner. By then, the creative activity didn’t stop. Between 1972 and 1976 his best pieces come to life. From this period are “Despertar”, “San si Juan no que sí”, “Para un rostro labrador”, “Pinasco”, “José Trombón”, “Para decir”, “Don José de todas partes”, among the more significant ones. He also writes the lyrics for “Ceferino Zarza, compañero” (music of Jorge Garbett) and “Cantando” (music by Jorge Krauch). With Carlos Noguera he composes the only piece that was written by the most important names of the Nueva Cancion Paraguaya, “Al caído en la víspera”, a homage to the Chilean composer and singer Victor Jara, who was brutally murdered in the military takeover (military coup) of 1973 in his country. The piece later will be popular with the name of “Victor Libre“.

We must mention specially his participation in the composition of part of the music of Lopez, a work of Juan Manuel Marcos mixing texts, songs and poetry, about the Paraguayan War. It was presented by the Grupo Experimental de Teatro “Anguekoi “with great success in 1973. The songs composed by Maneco are “¡Independencia o Muerte! ”, “Canto a Felipe Varela” (both on poems by Marcos) and “Resurgirás, Paraguay”, on the ode of Martin McMahon dedicated to our country.

Also in 1973, he joins the Quinteto Vocal de la Facultad de Derecho UNA, to participate at the university festival of the song. The group, that later will be the Grupo Sembrador, wins the first award to the composition playing “San Juan si Juan no que sí”.

In 1975, on one of the very rare occasions Augusto Roa Bastos visited our country, when he was still allowed to do so, Sembrador offers a recital homage to the great writer, presenting for the first time almost sixteen songs of the Nuevo Cancionero Paraguayo.

We can mention among them, “Donde la guarania crece”, composed by Maneco on a beautiful texto of Roa.
From ‘75 al ‘76, he composes for his dear friend Jorge Garbett -whom he had met in 1974-some lyrics of deep meaning: “Ella es así”, “Se le quiere” y “Lluvia”.

Between 1976 and 1977 he studies music with the masters Carlos Dos Santos and Luis Cañete. He composes “Cigarra, tonta cigarra”, on the text of José-Luis Appleyard, “Nda reiri oje’e”, on a poem of Rudi Torga and “Ka’akupe piari”, a strong polka whose lyrics are the only one totally written in Guarani language by Maneco.

After his experience with Taller Musical Sembrador, he stops writing songs and he dedicates passionately to his work as a journalist. From that time of “musical silence”-like he always used to call it- are the “ Cuentos “published in the great “Dominical Hoy”. He becomes skeptical and, he considers then that the songs are useless to help change a state of things that unfortunately were lasting too many decades.

Last years

Only by 1980, when the sickness which was to kill him was already declared, he goes back to creation when he finds out about the Primer Festival Ypacarai of the Musical Composition. He makes his last piece, ”Poncho de sesenta listas”, which won the second prize in that contest.

He left behind a fruitful musical production-numerous and large- as well as important journalistic writings and an unforgettable memory in his former students and his many friends. Maneco Galeano died in Asuncion, on a Tuesday, December 9, 1980, at 3:45 pm, from lung cancer. He was 35 years old.

References

Centro Cultural Cabildo
Diccionario Biográfico "FORJADORES DEL PARAGUAY", Primera Edición Enero de 2000. Distribuidora Quevedo de Ediciones. Buenos Aires, Argentina.

1945 births
1980 deaths
Paraguayan songwriters
Paraguayan harpists
Paraguayan people of Italian descent
20th-century Paraguayan male singers